Phora is a genus of scuttle flies (insects in the family Phoridae). There are at least 90 described species in Phora.

Species
These 98 species belong to the genus Phora:

 Phora acerosa Goto, 2006 c g
 Phora acuminata Goto, 2006 c g
 Phora adducta Schmitz, 1955 c g
 Phora advena Mikhailovskaya, 1986 c g
 Phora aerea Schmitz, 1930 i c g
 Phora algira Macquart, 1843 c g
 Phora americana Schmitz and Wirth, 1954 i c g
 Phora amplifrons Goto, 1985 c g
 Phora anceps (Zetterstedt, 1848) c g
 Phora archepyga Mostovski & Disney, 2001 c g
 Phora artifrons Schmitz, 1920 c g
 Phora aterrima (Fabricius, 1794) c g
 Phora atra (Meigen, 1804) i g
 Phora bernuthi Egger, 1862 c g
 Phora bullata Schmitz, 1927 c g
 Phora capillosa Schmitz, 1933 c g
 Phora carlina Schmitz, 1930 i c g
 Phora carpentieri Gobert, 1877 c g
 Phora cilicrus Schmitz, 1920 c g
 Phora coangustata Schmitz, 1927 i c g
 Phora concava g
 Phora congolensis Beyer, 1965 c g
 Phora contractifrons Goto, 1985 c g
 Phora convallium Schmitz, 1928 c g
 Phora convergens Schmitz, 1920 c g
 Phora crinitimargo Goto, 1985 c g
 Phora cristipes Schmitz and Wirth, 1954 i c g
 Phora digitiformis Goto, 2006 c g
 Phora dubia (Zetterstedt, 1848) c g
 Phora edentata Schmitz, 1920 c g
 Phora fenestrata Goto, 2006 c g
 Phora festinans (Scopoli, 1763) c g
 Phora flexuosa Egger, 1862 c g
 Phora fuliginosa (Macquart, 1835) c g
 Phora fulvipennis Goto, 2006 c g
 Phora fuscipes (Macquart, 1835) c g
 Phora glebiata Goto, 2006 c g
 Phora gorodkovi Mostovski, 2002 c g
 Phora greenwoodi Disney, 1989 c g
 Phora hamata Schmitz, 1927 c g
 Phora hamulata Liu & Chou, 1994 c g
 Phora himachalensis Mostovski, 2002 c g
 Phora holosericea Schmitz, 1920 i c g
 Phora horrida Schmitz, 1920 c g
 Phora hyperborea Schmitz, 1927 c g
 Phora incisurata Goto, 1985 c g
 Phora indivisa Schmitz, 1948 c g
 Phora kitadakensis Goto, 1985 c g
 Phora lacunifera Goto, 1984 c g
 Phora limpida Schmitz, 1935 c g
 Phora litoralis Dahl, 1896 c g
 Phora livida (Dufour, 1851) c g
 Phora maritima Mikhailovskaya, 1986 c g
 Phora michali Disney, 1998 c g
 Phora navigans Frauenfeld, 1867 c g
 Phora nepalensis Goto, 2006 c g
 Phora nigricornis Egger, 1862 c g
 Phora nigripennis Waltl, 1837 c g
 Phora nipponica Goto, 1986 c g
 Phora obscura (Zetterstedt, 1848) c g
 Phora occidentata Malloch, 1912 i c g
 Phora orientis Goto, 2006 c g
 Phora ozerovi Mostovski, 2002 c g
 Phora paramericana Brown, 2000 c g
 Phora paricauda Goto, 2006 c g
 Phora parvisaltator Goto, 1985 c g
 Phora penicillata Schmitz, 1920 c g
 Phora pilifemur Borgmeier, 1963 i c g
 Phora pilifrons Beyer, 1958 c g
 Phora postrema Borgmeier, 1963 i c g
 Phora praepadens Schmitz, 1927 g
 Phora praepandens Schmitz, 1927 c g
 Phora prisca Goto, 1985 c g
 Phora pubipes Schmitz, 1920 c g
 Phora rapida Meigen, 1838 c g
 Phora saigusai Goto, 1986 c g
 Phora salpana Goto, 2006 c g
 Phora scapularis Macquart, 1835 c g
 Phora shirozui Goto, 2006 c g
 Phora speighti Disney, 1982 c g
 Phora stictica Meigen, 1830 i c g
 Phora subconvallium Goto, 2006 c g
 Phora sulcaticera (Borgmeier, 1963) i g
 Phora sulcaticerca Borgmeier, 1963 c g
 Phora taiwana Goto, 2006 c g
 Phora tajicola Mostovski, 2002 c g
 Phora tattakana Goto, 2006 c g
 Phora tenuiforceps Goto, 2006 c g
 Phora theodori Dahl, 1912 c g
 Phora tincta Schmitz, 1920 c g
 Phora tripliciseta Schmitz and Wirth, 1954 i c g
 Phora truncata Brown, 2000 c g
 Phora tubericola Frauenfeld, 1866 c g
 Phora velutina Meigen, 1830 c g
 Phora vicina Macquart, 1835 c g
 Phora villosa Macquart, 1843 c g
 Phora viridinota Brues, 1916 i c g
 Phora zherikhini Mostovski, 2002 c g

Data sources: i=ITIS, c=Catalogue of Life, g=GBIF, b=Bugguide.net

References

Further reading

 
 
 

Phoridae
Platypezoidea genera